The Yungas Road, also known as Road Of Death is a cycle route about 60 km long that links the city of La Paz and the Yungas region of Bolivia. It draws about 25,000 tourists per year and is a major La Paz tourist attraction. Many tour operators cater to downhill mountain biking, providing information, guides, transport and equipment. At least 18 cyclists have died on the road since 1998. It was famous for dangerous condition and death for traffic accidents per year (averages around 209 accidents and 96 people deaths). The tourist route is a 64 km-long road with 3500 metres of descent. In 1995, the Inter-American Development Bank dubbed it as most dangerous road in the world.  Those characteristics made it a favorite tourist destination.

The route includes the Cotapata-Santa Bárbara section. It replaced the old road, built in 1930. It was considered dangerous because of its steep slopes, narrow single track, lack of guardrails, rain, and fog, and was nicknamed the "Road of Death". However, it was not the most dangerous road in the region. Unlike the rest of the country, traffic was left-hand, to allow the driver to assess the distance of their outer wheel from the edge of the road.

History 
Part of this road were built by Paraguayan prisoners that were captured after Chaco War in 1930s. It was of one of the few routes that connect the Amazon jungle up north, with the city of La Paz.

Due to steep slopes, combined with road that can fit only one vehicles (3 m in some places), and lack of the guardrails, this road was extremely dangerous.

Weather also causes problem; rain and fog reduces visibility, muddy terrain, and loose stones that fell from the mountains.

A new alternative route, now part of Route 3, was built during a 20-year period ending in 2006. The modernization included enlarging the carriageway from one to two lanes; asphalt paving; bridges, drainage, guardrails, and the building of a new section between Chusquipata and Yolosa, bypassing the most dangerous sections of the original road. As the result, the dangerous road is now only used for bicycles and walking.

Accidents 
On 24 July 1983, a bus fell off from the Yungas Road into a canyon, killing more than hundred passengers. It's one of the worst road accident in Bolivia.

Mid 1990s, around 200 to 300 drivers fell off to the cliff. It was around 1 deaths per day.

In 2011 total accidents were around 114 (the second route with the most accidents in Bolivia after the road between La Paz and Oruro), 42 people died.

Gallery

References

External links 
 

Mountain biking venues
Roads in Bolivia
Transport in La Paz Department (Bolivia)
Yungas